The Chicago Wolves are a professional ice hockey team playing in the American Hockey League (AHL). They are members of the Midwest division in the Western Conference. They were founded in 1994 as an expansion team in the International Hockey League (IHL). The Wolves joined the AHL in 2001 following the absorption of the IHL by the AHL.

The Wolves have won numerous awards in both leagues. The Wolves are four-time league champions having won two titles in both the AHL and the IHL. They were awarded the Fred A. Huber Trophy in the 1999–2000 season for having the best record in the IHL and have also received multiple trophies for winning their division. Individually, they have had four players lead their league in scoring a total of six times, with Steve Maltais accomplishing the feat in both leagues. Maltais is the most decorated individual in franchise history, winning three individual trophies along with being named a First Team All-Star three times and a Second Team All-Star three times.

Two players have had their numbers retired by the franchise. Wendell Young's number 1 was retired in 2001; five years later Maltais' number 11 was removed from circulation. The Wolves have also honored four other individuals with permanent banners hanging in the Allstate Arena. These are former players Tim Breslin and Dan Snyder, both of whom are deceased, as well as former head coach John Anderson and former general manager Kevin Cheveldayoff. Breslin and Snyder were further honored with the creation of team awards. The Tim Breslin Unsung Hero Award is awarded to the player "who best typifies Breslin's on-ice spirit and team-first attitude". The Dan Snyder Man of the Year Award is handed out to the Wolves' player who "demonstrates the most outstanding dedication to Chicago-area community service".

League awards

Team trophies and awards

The Wolves have won two championships in both the AHL and the IHL, first winning the Turner Cup as IHL champions during the 1997–98 and 1999–2000 seasons, then winning the Calder Cup in the 2001–02 and 2007–08 seasons. The 2001–02 championship coincided with the Wolves' inaugural AHL season. They were the sixth AHL team to win the championship in their first season.

Chicago received the 2009–10 President's Award, which recognizes an AHL organization for "excellence in all areas off the ice". Upon bestowing the award to the Wolves, the AHL called them a "forerunner in unique promotion and game-night experience" as well as "one of the league's model organizations in terms of community relations."  

a: Prior to 1998, the Robert W. Clarke Trophy was awarded to the champion of the Southern Conference/Division.
b: The John D. Chick Trophy was originally awarded to the Southern Division winner from 1974–95, and it has since been awarded to the winner of the Central (1996, 2002–03), Empire (1997–2000), Southern (2001) and West (2004–12) Divisions. Starting in 2012–13, the Chick Trophy goes to the regular-season champions of the South Division.
c: The Norman R. "Bud" Poile Trophy was previously awarded to winner of the West Division (2002–03), and regular season Western Conference champions (2004–11).

Individual awards

International Hockey League
While members of the IHL, the Wolves had two scoring champions on their team. Both Rob Brown and Steve Maltais led the league in points with Brown accomplishing the feat in 1995–96 and 1996–97; Maltais led the league in the 1999–2000 season. In the nine years the IHL Man of the Year was awarded, three Wolves players received the honors.

International Hockey League All-Star Game selections
The IHL first started holding All-Star games in 1962. Initially the game format had the defending champion playing against a collection of All-Stars from the teams in the league. The game changed to an East vs. West in 1967, but returned to the original format in 2000. The Wolves hosted the game as defending champions in 2001. They entered the game as the last place team in the Western Conference. Despite their record Chicago won the game 4–0. It was the only shutout in IHL All-Star game history. During the contest Steve Maltais recorded a goal and an assist, the two-point performance made him the IHL's all-time leading scorer in All-Star competition with 12 points in 7 games.

American Hockey League
In the 2006–07 season the Wolves had two players winning four individual trophies, three players garnering end of the year All-Star team honors, and two making the All-rookie team. The output was fueled by the Wolves' high scoring top line of Darren Haydar, Jason Krog, and Brett Sterling. Each player finished in the top 10 in AHL scoring with Haydar leading the league in points. Haydar also received the Les Cunningham Award as the league's Most Valuable Player (MVP). Sterling led the league in goal scoring and earned rookie of the year honors. In 2007–08 Krog led the league in goals, assists, and points, becoming only the third player in league history to accomplish the feat. His performance also earned him the MVP bringing his individual trophy total to three. He added a fourth after the Wolves won the Calder Cup and he was named playoff MVP.  
 
 

d: Dawes split time between Chicago and the Hamilton Bulldogs during the season.

American Hockey League All-Star Game selections

The AHL All-Star Classic is an exhibition game held yearly by the league since it was reintroduced in the 1994–95 season. Since the Wolves joined the league in 2001, twelve games have been played. During that time 22 Wolves' players have been selected to play in All-Star competition with Brett Sterling being the most frequent with 4 selections.   

e: Player was selected for the game, but did not play due to injury.
f: Player was a starter for the All-Star Game.
g: Player was selected for the game, but did not play due to a National Hockey League call-up.
h: Player was named team captain for the game.

Career achievements
The Chicago Wolves have retired two numbers in their history. Wendell Young was the first to receive the honor. Young played seven seasons for the Wolves and was a member of their two Turner Cup championship teams. He retired as the franchise leader in goaltender games played (322), wins (169), saves (8,467) and minutes played (17,912). The second retired number belonged to longtime forward Steve Maltais. Maltais was the only player to be part of the Wolves for their first 11 season. His longevity and production led to him being the Wolves all-time leader in goals (454); assists (496); points (950); penalty minutes (1,061) and games played (839).

The Wolves have also honored four individuals with permanent banners hanging in the Allstate Arena, two former players, a former head coach, and a former general manager. The two players, Tim Breslin and Dan Snyder, are both deceased. Snyder died during his playing career and Breslin shortly after his. While neither player recorded big statistical numbers, each was highly involved in the community and with charities during their time with the Wolves. They also honored John Anderson and Kevin Cheveldayoff for their contributions to the franchise. Anderson was head coach of the Wolves for all four of their championship teams. Likewise Cheveldayoff was general manager for the four championships and 12 years in total.

In 2013 defenseman Chris Chelios was elected to the Hockey Hall of Fame, becoming the first person affiliated with the organization to be so honored. Chelios joined the Wolves during the 2009–10 season at the age of 47 in hopes of earning a contract with a National Hockey League (NHL) team. He eventually signed with the Atlanta Thrashers and retired after the season.

Retired numbers

Personnel honored with banners

Hockey Hall of Fame

Team awards

Dan Snyder Man of the Year Award 
 
The Dan Snyder Man of the Year Award was created to honor former Wolves player Dan Snyder following his death from injuries resulting from a car accident. The award annually is given to the "Wolves' player who demonstrates the most outstanding dedication to Chicago-area community service each year."

Snyder played parts of two seasons with the Wolves, appearing in 91 games and registering 58 points. During the 2001–02 season he helped Chicago win their first Calder Cup. In his short time with the team, Snyder participated in numerous charitable events and "set an example to be followed by future members of the team." Snyder was critically injured after the Ferrari 360 Modena, being driven by his friend and teammate Dany Heatley, crashed. Snyder required surgery to repair a depressed skull fracture and was comatose.  Six days after the accident on October 5, 2003 he lapsed into septic shock and died, never regaining consciousness.

Tim Breslin Unsung Hero Award 

The Tim Breslin Unsung Hero Award was created to honor former player Tim Breslin following his 2005 death due to complications from appendiceal cancer. The Award is handed out annually to a player who "best typifies Breslin's on-ice spirit and team-first attitude." Players are nominated by the Wolves hockey operations department, with an internet fan poll determining the winner.

Breslin was one of the first three players signed by the Wolves following their founding as an IHL expansion team. He played five seasons with the Wolves, scoring 37 goals, 119 points in 330 games and was a member of Chicago's 1998 Turner Cup championship team. While with the Wolves Breslin was highly involved in charitable work in the local community, both through the franchise and on his own. Former GM Cheveldayoff said of Breslin "You could always count on Tim to come and compete every night and do what was needed for the team to win".

References 

Chicago Wolves
Chicago Wolves award winners